Janne Artturi Heikkinen (born May 16, 1990 in Oulu) is a Finnish politician and a member of the Parliament of Finland (MP). He got elected with 4124 personal votes from Oulu. 

Heikkinen joined the National Coalition Party in 2008 and was first elected to the Kempele City Council in the 2008 Finnish municipal elections and to the Parliament of Finland in 2019 Finnish parliamentary election. In 2019 he received a Master's degree from the University of Jyväskylä.

In Parliament
Heikkinen is member in the Parliamentary Transport and Communications Committee and Agriculture and Forestry Committee.

References

External links
 Janne Heikkinen – Janne Heikkinen's website 

Living people

1990 births
People from Oulu
Members of the Parliament of Finland (2019–23)
National Coalition Party politicians